Playgirl is a 1954 American film noir crime film directed by Joseph Pevney and starring Shelley Winters, Barry Sullivan and Colleen Miller. It was produced and released by Universal Pictures.

Plot
Innocent and attractive Phyllis Matthews leaves her Nebraska home for New York City and an ambition to become a model. Fran Davis, a nightclub singer, welcomes her to town, where she quickly meets magazine writer Tom Bradley and his editor, Mike Marsh.

Fran is having a fling with Mike, who is married but either unable or unwilling to get a divorce. Warned about life in the big city and how different it can be, Phyllis finds out first-hand in a hurry, wealthy Ted Andrews insulting her by offering $100 to spend the night.

Phyllis's beauty gives the magazine guys an idea. They pose her for the cover of their next issue, which makes Phyllis an overnight sensation. Fran, however, becomes morose, then angry, believing Phyllis is trying to seduce both Mike and Tom, and becoming desperate about her own future. A fit of anger results in an armed Fran accidentally shooting Mike, and the scandal envelops Phyllis, ruining her reputation and new career. She leaves for home, sadder but wiser.

Cast
 Shelley Winters as Fran 
 Barry Sullivan as Mike Marsh
 Colleen Miller as Phyllis Matthews 
 Richard Long as Barron Courtney 
 Gregg Palmer as Tom Burton
 Kent Taylor as Ted Andrews
 Jacqueline deWit as Greta Marsh
 Dave Barry as Jonathan 
 Philip Van Zandt as Lew Martel
 James McCallion as Paul
 Paul Richards as Wilbur
 Helen Beverly as Anne
 Myrna Hansen as Linda
 Mara Corday as Pam

Reception

The New York Times gave the film a mixed review, "Playgirl, at the Mayfair, is a routine, unconvincing case history about some of New York's plushier pitfalls. Shelley Winters, Barry Sullivan and a newcomer named Colleen Miller head the cast of this Universal-International drama that for all its pretensions of sophisticated insight seems as old and familiar as the very hills ... Inspired performances could hardly be expected from such contrived material, although the Blees scenario provides a smattering of pungent dialogue and one fine, ugly encounter between a sadistic restaurateur and a society weakling."

References

External links
 
 
 
 
 

1954 films
1954 crime drama films
American crime drama films
American black-and-white films
Film noir
Universal Pictures films
Films directed by Joseph Pevney
Films set in New York City
1950s English-language films
1950s American films